A multi-agent system (MAS or "self-organized system") is a computerized system composed of multiple interacting intelligent agents. Multi-agent systems can solve problems that are difficult or impossible for an individual agent or a monolithic system to solve. Intelligence may include methodic, functional, procedural approaches, algorithmic search or reinforcement learning.

Despite considerable overlap, a multi-agent system is not always the same as an agent-based model (ABM).  The goal of an ABM is to search for explanatory insight into the collective behavior of agents (which don't necessarily need to be "intelligent") obeying simple rules, typically in natural systems, rather than in solving specific practical or engineering problems. The terminology of ABM tends to be used more often in the science, and MAS in engineering and technology. Applications where multi-agent systems research may deliver an appropriate approach include online trading, disaster response, target surveillance   and social structure modelling.

Concept 

Multi-agent systems consist of agents and their environment. Typically multi-agent systems research refers to software agents. However, the agents in a multi-agent system could equally well be robots, humans or human teams. A multi-agent system may contain combined human-agent teams.

Agents can be divided into types spanning simple to complex. Categories include:
 Passive agents or "agent without goals" (such as obstacle, apple or key in any simple simulation)
 Active agents with simple goals (like birds in flocking, or wolf–sheep in prey-predator model)
 Cognitive agents (complex calculations)

Agent environments can be divided into:
 Virtual
 Discrete
 Continuous

Agent environments can also be organized according to properties such as accessibility (whether it is possible to gather complete information about the environment), determinism (whether an action causes a definite effect), dynamics (how many entities influence the environment in the moment), discreteness (whether the number of possible actions in the environment is finite), episodicity (whether agent actions in certain time periods influence other periods), and dimensionality (whether spatial characteristics are important factors of the environment and the agent considers space in its decision making). Agent actions are typically mediated via an appropriate middleware. This middleware offers a first-class design abstraction for multi-agent systems, providing means to govern resource access and agent coordination.

Characteristics 

The agents in a multi-agent system have several important characteristics:

 Autonomy: agents at least partially independent, self-aware, autonomous
 Local views: no agent has a full global view, or the system is too complex for an agent to exploit such knowledge
 Decentralization: no agent is designated as controlling (or the system is effectively reduced to a monolithic system)

Self-organisation and self-direction 

Multi-agent systems can manifest self-organisation as well as self-direction and other control paradigms and related complex behaviors even when the individual strategies of all their agents are simple. When agents can share knowledge using any agreed language, within the constraints of the system's communication protocol, the approach may lead to a common improvement. Example languages are Knowledge Query Manipulation Language (KQML) or Agent Communication Language (ACL).

System paradigms 

Many MAS are implemented in computer simulations, stepping the system through discrete "time steps". The MAS components communicate typically using a weighted request matrix, e.g. 
  Speed-VERY_IMPORTANT: min=45 mph, 
  Path length-MEDIUM_IMPORTANCE: max=60 expectedMax=40, 
  Max-Weight-UNIMPORTANT 
  Contract Priority-REGULAR 
and a weighted response matrix, e.g. 
  Speed-min:50 but only if weather sunny, 
  Path length:25 for sunny / 46 for rainy
  Contract Priority-REGULAR
  note – ambulance will override this priority and you'll have to wait

A challenge-response-contract scheme is common in MAS systems, where 
 First a "Who can?" question is distributed.
 Only the relevant components respond: "I can, at this price".
 Finally, a contract is set up, usually in several short communication steps between sides, 
also considering other components, evolving "contracts" and the restriction sets of the component algorithms.

Another paradigm commonly used with MAS is the "pheromone", where components leave information for other nearby components. These pheromones may evaporate/concentrate with time, that is their values may decrease (or increase).

Properties 

MAS tend to find the best solution for their problems without intervention. There is high similarity here to physical phenomena, such as energy minimizing, where physical objects tend to reach the lowest energy possible within the physically constrained world. For example: many of the cars entering a metropolis in the morning will be available for leaving that same metropolis in the evening.

The systems also tend to prevent propagation of faults, self-recover and be fault tolerant, mainly due to the redundancy of components.

Research 

The study of multi-agent systems is "concerned with the development and analysis of sophisticated AI problem-solving and control architectures for both single-agent and multiple-agent systems." Research topics include:
 agent-oriented software engineering
 beliefs, desires, and intentions (BDI)
 cooperation and coordination
 distributed constraint optimization (DCOPs)
 organization
 communication
 negotiation
 distributed problem solving
multi-agent learning
 agent mining 
 scientific communities (e.g., on biological flocking, language evolution, and economics)
 dependability and fault-tolerance
 robotics, multi-robot systems (MRS), robotic clusters

Frameworks 

Frameworks have emerged that implement common standards (such as the FIPA and OMG MASIF standards). These frameworks e.g. JADE, save time and aid in the standardization of MAS development.

Currently though, no standard is actively maintained from FIPA or OMG. Efforts for further development of software agents in industrial context are carried out in IEEE IES technical committee on Industrial Agents.

Applications 
MAS have not only been applied in academic research, but also in industry. MAS are applied in the real world to graphical applications such as computer games. Agent systems have been used in films. It is widely advocated for use in networking and mobile technologies, to achieve automatic and dynamic load balancing, high scalability and self-healing networks. They are being used for coordinated defence systems.

Other applications include transportation, logistics, graphics, manufacturing, power system, smartgrids and GIS.

Also, Multi-agent Systems Artificial Intelligence (MAAI) are used for simulating societies, the purpose thereof being helpful in the fields of climate, energy, epidemiology, conflict management, child abuse, .... Some organisations working on using multi-agent system models include Center for Modelling Social Systems, Centre for Research in Social Simulation, Centre for Policy Modelling, Society for Modelling and Simulation International. Hallerbach et al. discussed the application of agent-based approaches for the development and validation of automated driving systems via a digital twin of the vehicle-under-test and microscopic traffic simulation based on independent agents. Waymo has created a multi-agent simulation environment Carcraft to test algorithms for self-driving cars. It simulates traffic interactions between human drivers, pedestrians and automated vehicles. People's behavior is imitated by artificial agents based on data of real human behavior.

See also 

 Comparison of agent-based modeling software
 Agent-based computational economics (ACE)
 Artificial brain
 Artificial intelligence
 Artificial life
 Artificial life framework
 Artificial philosophy
 AI mayor
 Black box
 Blackboard system
 Complex systems
 Discrete event simulation
 Distributed artificial intelligence
 Emergence
 Evolutionary computation
 Friendly artificial intelligence
 Game theory
 Hallucination (artificial intelligence)
 Human-based genetic algorithm
 Hybrid intelligent system
 Knowledge Query and Manipulation Language (KQML)
 Microbial intelligence
 Multi-agent planning
 Multi-agent reinforcement learning
 Pattern-oriented modeling
 PlatBox Project
 Reinforcement learning
 Scientific community metaphor
 Self-reconfiguring modular robot
 Simulated reality
 Social simulation
 Software agent
 Software bot
 Swarm intelligence
 Swarm robotics

References

Further reading 

 
 
 
 
 The Journal of Autonomous Agents and Multi-Agent Systems (JAAMAS)
 
 
 
 
 
 Whitestein Series in Software Agent Technologies and Autonomic Computing, published by Springer Science+Business Media Group
 
 
 
 Cao, Longbing, Gorodetsky, Vladimir, Mitkas, Pericles A. (2009). Agent Mining: The Synergy of Agents and Data Mining, IEEE Intelligent Systems, vol. 24, no. 3, 64-72.